Ramanantsoavana's woolly lemur (Avahi ramanantsoavanai), also known as Ramanantsoavana's avahi or the Manombo woolly lemur, is a species of woolly lemur native to southeastern Madagascar.  It weighs about 1 kg.  It was originally considered a subspecies of the southern woolly lemur (A. meridionalis), A. m. ramanantsoavana, but was elevated to a separate species in 2006 based on molecular, phenotypic and morphological data.

References

Woolly lemurs
Mammals described in 2006